Trocon Markous Robert Jr., better known by his stage name FKi 1st, 1$T or 1st Down, is an American rapper, singer, songwriter, DJ, and record producer. 

In 2022, FKi 1st, the Atlanta native, released his new album titled ‘Last Player Alive’ . LAST PLAYER ALIVE (DELUXE) features artists such as Kash Doll, Buddy, Peezy, Rizz Capolatti, Pimpin Ken, Guapdad 4000, Twista, Coco Jones, Teddy Ray, MJG, & 8Ball. The experience 1$T is bringing with Last Player Alive is an inside look to what being a player truly is. ‘It’s a state of mind, how you move whether you are in a business or in the streets. All those things put together is keeping it player.’ - FKi 1st

FKi 1st’s signature vocals and introspective lyrics are hard to miss in his recent release.

 FKi 1st also appears on fan-favorite collaborations like “Cameras” with Uzi Vert, Post Malone and Mac Miller off the DJ Drama album Quality Street Music 2. He and Post collaborated on his early SoundCloud hits “TEARS,” “What’s Up” and “God Damn” off the August 26th Mixtape. He is also featured on the viral hit “Live A Lil” with MadeinTYO and Uno The Activist off his successful series Good Gas.

FKi 1st's production has yielded 20 Gold and Platinum records, including Iggy Azalea's "Work", Travis Porter's "Make It Rain", "Bring It Back" and "Ayy Ladies", "Watch Out" by 2 Chainz, and "Pick It Up" by Famous Dex featuring ASAP Rocky. He also co-wrote the 5× platinum single "White Iverson" by Post Malone.

In 2016, FKi 1st released his own EP, First Time For Everything, on Mad Decent and toured with Fetty Wap, Post Malone, Justin Bieber, Diplo, and others. He was also executive producer of Post Malone's debut album, Stoney (2016), which later went 3× platinum.

Career

Beginnings
FKi 1st embarked on his music career in the production and songwriting team FKi with Sauce Lord Rich. The duo grew up together in Atlanta, Georgia. When they first met, they realized they had the same music interests and tastes and started to build their own production company. The duo studied audio engineering at Full Sail University.

FKi subsequently began working with Collipark Music, where they were introduced to Travis Porter and produced the singles "Make it Rain" and "Bring it Back", inside a basement with a microphone and an Mbox. In 2009, FKi shared studio space with Jon Jon Traxx, Iggy Azalea (then known by her birth name, Amethyst Kelly), and Natalie Sims.

In 2012, FKi met American EDM producer Diplo, at a small local club in Atlanta and introduced him to Iggy Azalea. They flew out to Los Angeles to Mad Decent studios and to produce Azalea's TrapGold mixtape. FKi opened for her TrapGold European tour.

2014–2015
In 2014, FKi 1st met Post Malone and came out with "White Iverson". It was released on SoundCloud and received one million plays within three weeks.

Other noteworthy productions include "Watch Out" 2 Chainz, "A Milli Billi Trilli" 2 Chainz ft. Wiz Khalifa, "Weekend" by Mac Miller ft. Miguel, "Sloppy Toppy" by Travis Scott, "Pleazer" by Tyga, and more.

Alongside these tracks, FKi 1st also produced a few songs on Lil Uzi Vert's debut mixtape under DJ Drama and Don Cannon Generation Now label, Luv Is Rage. These tracks include "Moist" Lil Uzi Vert, "Wit My Crew x 1987" Lil Uzi Vert, and "Nuyork Nights at 21" Lil Uzi Vert.

FKi 1st deejayed numerous events such as Low End Theory, Brownies & Lemonade, Trap City, Control Avalon, and more. In August 2015 he opened for Rita Ora at the El Rey theatre in Los Angeles and Drais Beach Club in Las Vegas. FKi 1st has also deejayed Mad Decent's Mad Decent Block Party in Los Angeles, Brooklyn, and Phoenix.

2016–2017

In 2016 FKi 1st released his solo EP First Time For Everything on Mad Decent. The EP features artists Post Malone, Njomza, ILoveMakonnen, Danny Seth, and more.

In April, FKi 1st joined Diplo & Friends at the Heineken House at Coachella. He also went on to tour with Fetty Wap on his Welcome to the Zoo Tour, Justin Bieber's Purpose Tour, and Post Malone's Hollywood Dreams Tour.

FKi 1st won an award for "White Iverson" at the BMI R&B Hip Hop Awards.

FKi 1st was the executive producer for Post Malone's debut album Stoney, and has recently collaborated with artists Njomza, Party Favor, Nicki Minaj, 2 Chainz, Anne Dereaux, and more. FKi FKi 1st teamed up with fellow Atlanta rappers Drugrixh Peso and Yakki releasing single "Do What Bosses Do" through his own label Zooly the Label.

2018–2019 
In February 2018 he started the Good Gas series of albums featuring artists such as 2 Chainz, ASAP Ferg, and MadeinTYO.

He released the album Tokyo Project in December 2019.

2020-2021

Some notable songs produced in 2020-2021 are Don Toliver - Crossfaded, Kash Doll - Wake Up, S3nsi Molly - Don't Call Me Bo and Parlay Pass - Honda to name a few. 

In April of 2020, FKi 1st & Victoria Kimani, team up musically to break you a collaborative album titled Afreaka 

On April 1st, 2021, the Street Dream Team album dropped. The album features FKi 1st, Band Gang Lonnie Bands & Good Gas.

In June of 2021,  FKi. 1st. collaborated with Good Gas to make Bushido which was featured in F9 (The Fast Saga  Original Motion Picture Soundtrack)

2022-PRESENT

On June 1st, 2022, FKi 1st released released his latest album titled Last Player Alive and has since then dropped the Deluxe version of LPA with featured artists such as Kash Doll, Buddy, Peezy, Rizz Capolatti, Pimpin Ken, Guapdad 4000, Twista, Coco Jones, Teddy Ray, MJG, & 8Ball.

Notable 2022 FKi 1st productions: 2Chainz - Neighbors Know My Name, Peezy - Interlude and Hustlers Vs. Scammers

Musical style
FKi 1st's musical style ranges from trap to EDM. He has referred to himself as the black Diplo.

His record production and songwriting team, FKi, does a blend of glitch hop, hip hop, drum and bass and trap. Their sound was first heard on their premier mixtape Transformers n the Hood, which was presented and produced by Diplo, alongside HXV as well as Mayhem, and received attention from electronic, hip hop and trap music forums throughout the US and abroad. FKi went on to produce Iggy Azalea's entire TrapGold and in 2012 served as the official DJs for her European tour. FKi has also collaborated with other producers like Borgore, Flosstradamus, The Invisible Men and Diplo, among others.

Discography

Solo albums
 First Time for Everything Part 1 (2016)
 Tokyo Project (2019)
 Last Player Alive (2022)
 Last Player Alive (Deluxe) (2022)

Productions

References

External links
 

FKi 1st
FKi 1st
FKi 1st
FKi 1st
FKi 1st
FKi 1st
FKi 1st
FKi 1st
FKi 1st
FKi 1st
FKi 1st
FKi 1st
FKi 1st
FKi 1st
FKi 1st
FKi 1st
FKi 1st
1989 births